The Men's 20 km race walk event at the 2005 World Championships in Athletics was held on August 6 in the streets of Helsinki with the start at 18:40h local time, and the goal line situated in the Helsinki Olympic Stadium.

Medalists

Abbreviations
All times shown are in hours:minutes:seconds

Records

Startlist

Intermediates

Final ranking

See also
2005 Race Walking Year Ranking

External links
IAAF results
 Die Leichtathletik-Statistik-Seite

20 km walk men
Racewalking at the World Athletics Championships